Polyanka is a Moscow Metro station in the Yakimanka District, Central Administrative Okrug, Moscow, Russia. It is on the Serpukhovsko-Timiryazevskaya Line. It was opened in 1986. The station is a column-trivault, with a large sculpture presenting a couple with a child, inside a circle, at the end.

A transfer to the Kaluzhsko-Rizhskaya line at Yakimanka station would be planned in the 1980s. The station would open between the mid-1990s and the early 2000s. The construction would start in 1996 and would be finished in 2000. It was later cancelled and the completion of the station has not yet to be occurred until further notice.

Gallery

Moscow Metro stations
Railway stations in Russia opened in 1986
Serpukhovsko-Timiryazevskaya Line
Railway stations located underground in Russia